Stade Municipal de Bohicon is a multi-use stadium in Bohicon, Benin.  It is currently used mostly for football matches and is the home ground of Tonnerre d'Abomey FC of the Benin Premier League.  The stadium has a capacity of 5,000 spectators.

References

External links
 Stadium information

Football venues in Benin
Tonnerre d'Abomey FC